This is a list of Serbian chronicles, most often referring to works of the Middle Ages, until the Ottoman conquest, hence called Old Serbian chronicles. There exist approximately 30 Serbian chronicles from the period between 1390 and 1526.



Non-Serbian chronicles including Serbian history
De Administrando Imperio (960), by Constantine VII
Chronicle of the Priest of Duklja (possibly 14th century)
Kingdom of the Slavs (1601), by Mavro Orbini

See also
Serbian manuscripts

References

Sources

Further reading

External links

 
History of the Serbs